Clearlake Oaks is a census-designated place (CDP) in Lake County, California, United States. It is located on the northeast of Clear Lake, 8 miles (13.8 km) northwest of the town of Clearlake, at an elevation of 1,335 feet (407 m). The population was 2,359 at the 2010 census, down from 2,402 at the 2000 census.

History 
The community was formerly named Stubbs and Clear Lake Oaks.

The site of the original town, inland of State Route 20, was subdivided by the 1920s.  Situated in a broad canyon mouth, the original town site is about 4 blocks long and 3 deep, triangular in shape, with a plaza site in its center.  Today the plaza is paved and used for parking by the church located along the west side.  Most of the homes in the village remain true to their "fishing cottage" roots.

The Stubbs post office opened in 1926, and changed its name to Clearlake Oaks in 1935. The name Stubbs honored Charles Stubbs, a local landowner.
The relocation of the post office, the aging population, and the coming of Wal-Mart have combined to kill the "downtown".  In 1990, there were two markets, a chain hardware store, two gas stations, video store, salon, and several restaurants and bars.  A privately operated marina had fish and ski boats for rent.  But by the late nineties, Clearlake Oaks was down to one market, one convenience store, and a struggling antique store.

The park, beach, and pier were refurbished a few years back.  Recently, a wine-tasting room has opened and live music can again be heard at The Barn.  There is hope that something may be yet built at the sites of The Timbers or Sal's Market.  As of 2007, the property next to the grocery store was being cleared and turned into a park, called Nylander Park after the owner of the local grocery store.  There are two gas stations, several saloons, a post office, and several restaurants.

Geography

Demographics

2010
The 2010 United States Census reported that Clearlake Oaks had a population of 2,359. The racial makeup of Clearlake Oaks was 2,054 (87.1%) White, 54 (2.3%) African American, 45 (1.9%) Native American, 34 (1.4%) Asian, 1 (0.0%) Pacific Islander, 60 (2.5%) from other races, and 111 (4.7%) from two or more races. Hispanic or Latino of any race were 192 persons (8.1%).

The Census reported that 2,359 people (100% of the population) lived in households, 0 (0%) lived in non-institutionalized group quarters, and 0 (0%) were institutionalized.

There were 1,178 households, out of which 183 (15.5%) had children under the age of 18 living in them, 429 (36.4%) were opposite-sex married couples living together, 132 (11.2%) had a female householder with no husband present, 67 (5.7%) had a male householder with no wife present.  There were 91 (7.7%) unmarried opposite-sex partnerships, and 18 (1.5%) same-sex married couples or partnerships. 442 households (37.5%) were made up of individuals, and 249 (21.1%) had someone living alone who was 65 years of age or older. The average household size was 2.00.  There were 628 families (53.3% of all households); the average family size was 2.57.

The population was spread out, with 323 people (13.7%) under the age of 18, 120 people (5.1%) aged 18 to 24, 350 people (14.8%) aged 25 to 44, 828 people (35.1%) aged 45 to 64, and 738 people (31.3%) who were 65 years of age or older.  The median age was 54.9 years. For every 100 females, there were 98.9 males.  For every 100 females age 18 and over, there were 97.7 males.

The homeowner vacancy rate was 5.9%; the rental vacancy rate was 9.8%.  1,535 people (65.1% of the population) lived in owner-occupied housing units and 824 people (34.9%) lived in rental housing units.

2000
As of the census of 2000, there were 2,402 people, 1,194 households, and 655 families residing in the CDP. The racial makeup of the CDP was 90.01% White, 3.79% Black or African American, 1.71% Native American, 0.58% Asian, 0.08% Pacific Islander, 0.67% from other races, and 3.16% from two or more races.  6.00% of the population were Hispanic or Latino of any race.

There were 1,194 households, out of which 15.2% had children under the age of 18 living with them, 42.0% were married couples living together, 9.5% had a female householder with no husband present, and 45.1% were non-families. 38.0% of all households were made up of individuals, and 20.2% had someone living alone who was 65 years of age or older.  The average household size was 2.01 and the average family size was 2.58.

In the CDP, the population was spread out, with 17.0% under the age of 18, 3.5% from 18 to 24, 17.6% from 25 to 44, 28.6% from 45 to 64, and 33.3% who were 65 years of age or older.  The median age was 55 years. For every 100 females, there were 96.4 males.  For every 100 females age 18 and over, there were 94.1 males.

The median income for a household in the CDP was $24,449, and the median income for a family was $30,044. Males had a median income of $30,227 versus $17,011 for females. The per capita income for the CDP was $14,297.  About 15.0% of families and 21.9% of the population were below the poverty line, including 31.2% of those under age 18 and 9.7% of those age 65 or over.

Government

References

External links

Census-designated places in Lake County, California
Census-designated places in California